Ditaeniella grisescens is a species of fly in the family Sciomyzidae. It is found in the  Palearctic.

References

Sciomyzidae
Insects described in 1830
Muscomorph flies of Europe